The 1994 Prix de l'Arc de Triomphe was a horse race held at Longchamp on Sunday 2 October 1994. It was the 73rd running of the Prix de l'Arc de Triomphe.

The winner was Carnegie, a three-year-old colt trained in France by André Fabre. The winning jockey was Thierry Jarnet.

Race details
 Sponsor: Forte Group
 Purse: 6,800,000 F; First prize: 4,000,000 F
 Going: Good to Soft
 Distance: 2,400 metres
 Number of runners: 20
 Winner's time: 2m 31.1s

Full result

 Abbreviations: nse = nose; shd = short-head; hd = head; snk = short-neck; nk = neck

Winner's details
Further details of the winner, Carnegie.
 Sex: Colt
 Foaled: 26 February 1991
 Country: Ireland
 Sire: Sadler's Wells; Dam: Detroit (Riverman)
 Owner: Sheikh Mohammed
 Breeder: Swettenham Stud

References

External links
 Colour Chart – Arc 1994

Prix de l'Arc de Triomphe
 1994
Prix de l'Arc de Triomphe
Prix de l'Arc de Triomphe
Prix de l'Arc de Triomphe